Knightor is a hamlet in the parish of Treverbyn, Cornwall, England.

References

Hamlets in Cornwall